is the tenth studio album by Japanese singer-songwriter Miyuki Nakajima, released in March 1983.

In addition to the songwriting and produce for the entire album, she also participated in arrangement for the first time, except five songs which were arranged by Takayuki Inoue and featured in the latter half of the LP.

The final track on Hunch became one of fan favorites for years, though none of the contents were released as a single when the album came out. "Fight" later appeared as a double A-Side of a chart topper single "Between the Sky and You", released in 1994 and sold over a million copies. The song which became well known because of commercial success of a single has been covered several times, interpreted by artists such as Takuro Yoshida, Noriyuki Makihara and Masaharu Fukuyama
.

Hunch debuted at the number-one on the Japanese Oricon and retained the position for 3 weeks, but quickly fell off the chart compared to its predecessors that likewise reached the top.

Track listing
All songs written and composed by Miyuki Nakajima.

Side one
All songs arranged by Miyuki Nakajima
"" – 5:00
"" – 4:35
"" – 4:29
"" – 6:26

Side two
All songs arranged by Takayuki Inoue
"" – 6:30
""  – 3:3
"" – 3:16
"" – 3:05
"" – 7:04

Personnel
Yuichi Tokashiki – drums on "Only Two of Us", "Natsu Miyage", "Kami wo Arau On'na", "En"
Hideo Yamaki – drums on "Bye Bye Dock of the Bay"
Eiji Himamura – drums on "Tequila wo Nomihoshite", "Kingyo", "Fight"
Jun Moriya – drums on "Dare no Sei demo Nai Ame ga"
Akira Okazawa – bass on "Only Two of Us", "Natsu Miyage", "Kami wo Arai On'na", "Dare no Sei demo Nai Ame ga", "En"
Yasuo Tomikura – bass on "Tequila wo Nomihoshite"
Haruomi Hosono – bass on "Bye Bye Dock of the Bay"
Fujimal Yoshino – electric guitar
Ben Bridges – electric guitar on "Bye Bye Dock of the Bay", "Dare no Sei demo Nai Ame ga"
Chuei Yoshikawa – acoustic guitar, 12-string guitar
Nobuo Kurata – keyboards
Nobu Saito – percussion
Jake H Conception – tenor sax
Eiji Arai – Trombone
Shin Nagaoka – horn on "Dare no Sei demo Nai Ame ga"
Koji Hashima – French horn on "Dare no Sei demo Nai Ame ga"
Yoshikazu Kishi – French horn on "Dare no Sei demo Nai Ame ga"
Yukio Eto – flute on "En"
Takeru Shinohara – alto flute on "Fight!"
Mitsuru Aiba – alto flute on "Fight!", Piccolo on "En"
Obata – fagot on "En"
Kenji Shiraishi – timpani on "En"
Isao Kaneyama – malimba
Sanae Tanaka – mandolin
Ohno ensemble – strings on "Natsu Miyage"
Scramble – strings on "Kami wo Arau On'na"
Yasuhiro Kido – chorus
Makoto Matsushita – chorus
Miyuki Nakajima – vocals

Chart positions

Album

Single

References

1983 albums
Miyuki Nakajima albums
Pony Canyon albums